Emtunga is a locality situated in Vara Municipality, Västra Götaland County, Sweden with 273 inhabitants in 2010.

See also 
 Emtunga, a company founded in Emtunga in 1945.

References 

Populated places in Västra Götaland County
Populated places in Vara Municipality